Diana Ross (born March 26, 1944) is an American singer and actress. She rose to fame as the lead singer of the vocal group The Supremes, who became Motown's most successful act during the 1960s and one of the world's best-selling girl groups of all time. They remain the best-charting female group in 
history, with a total of twelve number-one hit singles on the US Billboard Hot 100, including "Where Did Our Love Go", "Baby Love", "Come See About Me", and "Love Child".

Following departure from the Supremes in 1970, Ross embarked on a successful solo career in music, film, television and on stage. Her eponymous debut solo album featured the U.S. number-one hit "Ain't No Mountain High Enough" and music anthem "Reach Out and Touch (Somebody's Hand)".  It was followed with her second solo album, Everything Is Everything (1970), which spawned her first UK number-one single "I'm Still Waiting". She continued her successful solo career by mounting elaborate record-setting world-wide concert tours, starring in a number of highly watched prime-time television specials, and releasing hit albums like Touch Me in the Morning (1973), Mahogany (1975), and Diana Ross (1976) as well as their number-one hit singles, "Touch Me in the Morning", "Theme from Mahogany (Do You Know Where You're Going To)", and "Love Hangover", respectively. Ross further released numerous top-ten hits on various Billboard charts throughout the 1970s, '80s, and '90s. She achieved several more global number-one singles, "Upside Down" (1980), "Endless Love" (1981), "Why Do Fools Fall in Love" (1982), "Chain Reaction" (1986), "If We Hold on Together" (1988) and  "When You Tell Me That You Love Me" (1991).

Ross has also achieved mainstream success and recognition as an actor. Her first role was her Golden Globe Award-winning and Academy Award-nominated portrayal of Billie Holiday in the film Lady Sings the Blues (1972); she also recorded its soundtrack, which became a number one hit on the U.S. album chart. She also starred in two other feature films, Mahogany (1975) and The Wiz (1978), and later appeared in the television films Out of Darkness (1994), for which she was nominated for a Golden Globe Award, and Double Platinum (1999).

Ross was named the "Female Entertainer of the Century" by Billboard in 1976. Since her solo career began in 1970, Ross has released 25 studio albums, numerous singles, and compilations that have sold more than 100 million records worldwide. She is the only female artist to have had number-one singles on the Billboard Hot 100 as a solo artist, as the other half of a duet, as a member of a trio, and as an ensemble member. In 2021, Billboard ranked her the 30th greatest Hot 100 artist of all time. Her hits as a Supreme and a solo artist combined put  Ross among the Top 5 artists on the Billboard Hot 100 singles chart from 1955 to 2018. She had a top 10 UK hit in every one of the last five decades, and sang lead on a top 75 hit single at least once every year from 1964 to 1996 in the UK, a period of 33 consecutive years and a record for any performer. In 1988, Ross was inducted to the Rock and Roll Hall of Fame as a member of the Supremes, and is one of the rare performers to have two stars on the Hollywood Walk of Fame. She was the recipient of a Special Tony Award in 1976, the Kennedy Center Honors in 2007, the Grammy Lifetime Achievement Award in 2012 and 2023 (the latter as a member of The Supremes), and the Presidential Medal of Freedom in 2016.

Early life

Diana Ross was born in Detroit, Michigan, on March 26, 1944. She was the second of six children born to Ernestine (née Moten; January 27, 1916October 9, 1984) and Fred Ross, Sr. (July 4, 1920November 21, 2007). Her mother named her Diane, but the birth certificate was mistakenly filled out with the name Diana. Her family and Detroit friends called her Diane all her life. Ross grew up with two sisters (Barbara and Rita) and three brothers: Arthur;  Fred Jr.; and Wilbert, also known as Chico.

Ross and her family originally resided at 635 Belmont St., in the North End section of Detroit, near Highland Park, Michigan, where her neighbor was Smokey Robinson. When Ross was seven, her mother contracted tuberculosis, causing her to become seriously ill. Ross' parents sent their children to live with Ernestine's parents, the Reverend (pastor of Bessemer Baptist Church) and Mrs. William Moton in Bessemer, Alabama. After her mother recovered, she and her siblings returned to Detroit.

On her 14th birthday, in 1958, her family relocated to the working-class Brewster-Douglass Housing Projects, settling at St. Antoine Street. Ross attended Cass Technical High School, a four-year college and preparatory magnet school, in downtown Detroit, and, aspiring to become a fashion designer, she took classes in clothing design, millinery, pattern making, and tailoring. In the evenings and on weekends she also took modeling and cosmetology classes (Ross has written that Robinson loaned her the funds required to attend these), and participated in several of the school's extracurricular activities, including its swim team. In 1960, Hudson's downtown Detroit store hired Ross as its first African American bus girl. For extra income, she also provided hairdressing services to her neighbors. Ross graduated from Cass Tech in January 1962.

Career

1959–1970: The Supremes

When she was fifteen, Ross joined the Primettes, the sister group to a male vocal group called the Primes, after she had been brought to the attention of music manager Milton Jenkins by Primes member Paul Williams. Among the other members of the Primettes were Florence Ballard (the first group member hired by Jenkins), Mary Wilson, and Betty McGlown, Williams' then-girlfriend. After the Primettes won a talent competition in 1960 in Windsor, Ontario, A&R executive and songwriter, Robert Bateman invited them to audition for Motown Records.

Later, following the success of her live performances at sock hops and similar events, Ross approached William "Smokey" Robinson, her former neighbor (rumored to also have been her childhood boyfriend) about auditioning for Motown; he insisted that the group audition for him first. Robinson then agreed to bring the Primettes to Motown, on condition that they allow him and his group, the Miracles, to hire the Primettes' guitarist, Marv Tarplin (who had been discovered by Ross) for an upcoming tour. Tarplin ended up playing in Robinson's band(s) for the next 30-plus years. In her autobiography, Secrets of a Sparrow, Ross wrote that she felt that this had been was "a fair trade".

The Primettes later auditioned for Motown, before various Motown executives. In Berry Gordy's autobiography, To Be Loved, Gordy recalled that he had been heading to a business meeting when he happened to hear Ross singing "There Goes My Baby", and that Ross's voice "stopped me in my tracks". He approached the group and asked them to perform it again, but, after learning how young they were, Gordy advised them to finish high school before trying to get signed by Motown.

Undeterred, the group began coming to Motown's Hitsville U.S.A. headquarters every day, offering to provide extra help for Motown's recordings, often including hand claps and background vocals. That year, the group recorded two tracks for Lu Pine Records, with Ross singing lead on one of them. During the group's early years, Ross served as its hairstylist, make-up artist, seamstress, and costume designer. In late 1960, having replaced McGlown with Barbara Martin, the Primettes were allowed to record their own songs at Hitsville's studio, many written by "Smokey" Robinson, who, by then, was vice president of Motown ("Your Heart Belongs to Me" and "A Breathtaking Guy"). Gordy, too, composed songs for the trio, including "Buttered Popcorn" (featuring Ballard on lead) and "Let Me Go the Right Way". While these songs were regional hits, they were not nationwide successes.

In January 1961, Gordy agreed to sign the group on the condition they change their name. Songwriter and Motown secretary Janie Bradford approached Florence Ballard, the only group member at the studio at the time, to pick out a new name for the group. Ballard chose "Supremes", reportedly, because it was the only name on the list that did not end with "ette". Upon hearing the new name, the other members weren't impressed, with Ross telling Ballard she feared the group would be mistaken for a male vocal group (a male vocal group was, indeed, named the Supremes). Gordy signed the group under their new name on January 15, 1961.

A year later, Barbara Martin left the group, reducing the quartet to a trio. In late 1963, the group had their first hit with "When the Lovelight Starts Shining Through His Eyes", peaking at No. 23 on the Billboard Hot 100 pop chart. At the end of the year, Gordy assigned Ross the role of the group's lead singer.

In June 1964, while on tour with Dick Clark's Cavalcade of Stars, the group scored their first number-one hit with "Where Did Our Love Go", paving the way for unprecedented success: between August 1964 and May 1967, Ross, Wilson, and Ballard sang on ten number-one hit singles, all of which also made the UK Top 40. The group had also become a hit with audiences both domestically and abroad, going on to become Motown's most successful vocal act throughout the sixties.

Ross began to dominate interviews with the media, answering questions aimed at Ballard or Wilson. She pushed for more pay than her colleagues. In 1965, she began using the name Diana from the mistake on her birth certificate, surprising Ballard and Wilson who had only known her as Diane. Following significant issues with comportment, weight, and alcoholism, Florence Ballard was fired from the Supremes by Gordy in July 1967, hiring Cindy Birdsong from Patti LaBelle and the Bluebelles as Ballard's replacement. Gordy renamed the group Diana Ross & the Supremes, making it easier to charge a larger performance fee for a solo star and a backing group, as it did for other renamed Motown groups. Gordy initially considered having Ross leave the Supremes for a solo career in 1966, eventually changing his mind because he felt the group's success was still too significant for Ross to pursue solo obligations. Ross remained with the Supremes until early 1970.

The group appeared as a trio of singing nuns in a 1968 episode of the popular NBC TV series Tarzan. Between their early 1968 single "Forever Came Today" and their final single with Ross, "Someday We'll Be Together", Ross would be the only Supremes member to be featured on many of their recordings, often accompanied by session singers the Andantes or, as in the case of "Someday We'll Be Together", Julia and Maxine Waters and Johnny Bristol. Still, Wilson and Birdsong continued to sing on recordings.

Gordy drove Ross relentlessly throughout this period and Ross, due to anxiety arising from Gordy's demands of her, began suffering from anorexia nervosa, according to her autobiography, Secrets of a Sparrow. During a 1967 performance in Boston, Massachusetts, Ross collapsed onstage and had to be hospitalized for exhaustion.

In 1968, Ross began to perform as a solo artist on television specials, including the Supremes' own specials such as TCB and G.I.T. on Broadway, The Dinah Shore Show, and a Bob Hope special, among others. In mid-1969, Gordy decided that Ross would depart the group by the end of that year, and Ross began recording her initial solo work that July. One of the first plans for Ross to establish her own solo career was to publicly introduce a new Motown recording act.

Though she herself did not claim their discovery, Motown's publicity department credited Ross with having discovered the Jackson 5. Ross would introduce the group during several public events, including The Hollywood Palace. In November, Ross confirmed a split from the Supremes in Billboard. Ross's presumed first solo recording, "Someday We'll Be Together", was eventually released as a Supremes recording and became the group's final number-one hit on the Hot 100. It was also the final number-one Billboard Hot 100 single of the 1960s. Ross made her final appearance with the Supremes at the Frontier Hotel in Las Vegas, Nevada on January 14, 1970.

1970–1980: Solo career and films

In May 1970, Ross released her eponymous debut solo album, which included her signature songs, "Reach Out and Touch (Somebody's Hand)" and "Ain't No Mountain High Enough", the latter becoming Ross's first number-one solo single. Follow-up albums, Everything Is Everything (1970) and Surrender (1971) came out shortly afterwards. In 1971, the ballad "I'm Still Waiting" became her first number-one single in the UK. Later in 1971, Ross starred in her first solo television special, Diana!, which included the Jackson 5.

In 1971, Diana Ross began working on her first film, Lady Sings the Blues (1972), which was a loosely based biography on singer Billie Holiday. Despite some criticism of her for taking the role, once the film opened in October 1972, Ross won critical acclaim for her performance in the film. Jazz critic Leonard Feather, a friend of Holiday's, praised Ross for "expertly capturing the essence of Lady Day". Ross's role in the film won her Golden Globe Award and Academy Award nominations for Best Actress. The soundtrack to Lady Sings the Blues became just as successful, reaching No. 1 on the Billboard 200, staying there for two weeks, and selling two million units. In November 1972, Ross sung the song "When We Grow Up" for the children's album, Free to Be... You and Me.

In 1973, Ross had her second number-one hit in the U.S. with the ballad "Touch Me in the Morning". Later in the year, Motown issued Diana & Marvin, a duet album with fellow Motown artist Marvin Gaye. The album became an international hit. Touring throughout 1973, Ross became the first entertainer in Japan's history to receive an invitation to the Imperial Palace for a private audience with the Empress Nagako, wife of Emperor Hirohito.

In April 1974, Ross became the first African-American woman to co-host the Academy Awards, with John Huston, Burt Reynolds, and David Niven.

After the release of a modestly successful album, Last Time I Saw Him (1973), Ross's second film, Mahogany, was released in 1975. The film reunited her with Billy Dee Williams, her co-star in Lady Sings the Blues and featured costumes designed by Ross herself. The story of an aspiring fashion designer who becomes a runway model and the toast of the industry, Mahogany was a troubled production from its inception. The film's original director, Tony Richardson, was fired during production, and Berry Gordy assumed the director's chair himself.

Gordy and Ross clashed during filming, with Ross leaving the production before shooting was completed, forcing Gordy to use secretary Edna Anderson as a body double for Ross. While a box-office success, the film was not well received by the critics: Time magazine's review of the film chastised Gordy for "squandering one of America's most natural resources: Diana Ross".
Nonetheless, Ross had her third number-one hit in the U.S. with "Theme from Mahogany (Do You Know Where You're Going To)".

A year later, in 1976, Ross released her fourth solo number-one hit, "Love Hangover", a sensual, dramatic mid-tempo song that bursts into an uptempo disco tune. Later that year, Ross launched her "An Evening with Diana Ross" tour. The tour's success led to a two-week stint at Broadway's Palace Theatre and a 90-minute, Emmy-nominated television special of the same name, featuring special make-up effects by Stan Winston, for a scene in which Ross portrayed legendary cabaret artist Josephine Baker and blues singers Bessie Smith and Ethel Waters, and a Special Tony Award.

The albums Baby It's Me (1977) and Ross (1978) sold modestly.

In 1977, Motown had acquired the film rights to the Broadway play The Wiz, an African-American reinterpretation of L. Frank Baum's The Wonderful Wizard of Oz. The film initially was to include the stage actors who had performed on the play, but producer Rob Cohen could not garner the interest of any major Hollywood film studios. It was not until Ross convinced Cohen to cast her (instead of Stephanie Mills, who portrayed Dorothy on Broadway) as Dorothy that Universal Pictures agreed to finance the production.

This casting decision led to a change in the film's script, in which Dorothy went from a schoolgirl to a schoolteacher. The role of the Scarecrow, also performed by someone else onstage, was eventually given to Ross's former Motown labelmate, Michael Jackson.  Ross and Jackson had a modest dance hit with their recording for the film of "Ease on Down the Road". Their second duet, actually as part of the ensemble of The Wiz, "Brand New Day", found some success overseas.

The film adaptation of The Wiz had been a $24 million production, but upon its October 1978 release, it earned only $21,049,053 at the box office. Though pre-release television broadcast rights had been sold to CBS for over $10 million, the film produced a net loss of $10.4 million for Motown and Universal. At the time, it was the most expensive film musical ever made. The film's failure ended Ross's short career on the big screen and contributed to the Hollywood studios' reluctance to produce the all-black film projects which had become popular during the blaxploitation era of the early to mid-1970s for several years.

In 1979, Ross released The Boss, continuing her popularity with dance audiences, as the title song became a number-one dance single. On July 16, 1979, Ross guest-hosted an episode of Johnny Carson's The Tonight Show, featuring Lynda Carter, George Carlin, and Muhammad Ali as guests. Later that year, Ross hosted the HBO special, Standing Room Only, filmed at Caesars Palace's Circus Maximus Theater in Las Vegas, Nevada, during her "Tour '79" concert tour. This concert special is noted for its opening, during which Ross literally makes her entrance through a movie screen. In November of that year, Ross performed The Boss album's title track as a featured artist during the Macy's Thanksgiving Day Parade, in New York City.

In 1980, Ross released her most successful album to date, Diana. Composed by Chic's guitarist Nile Rodgers and bassist Bernard Edwards, the album included the hits "I'm Coming Out" and "Upside Down", the latter becoming her fifth chart-topping single in the U.S.

Ross scored a Top 10 hit in late 1980 with the theme song to the film It's My Turn. Continuing her connections with Hollywood, Ross recorded the duet ballad "Endless Love", with Lionel Richie. The song would become her sixth and final single to reach number one on the Billboard Hot 100.

1981–1987: Leaving Motown and RCA years

Ross began negotiations to leave Motown at the end of 1980. After over 20 years with the label, Ross received US$250,000 as severance. RCA Records offered Ross a $20 million, seven-year recording contract, which gave her complete production control of her albums. Before signing onto the label, Ross allegedly asked Berry Gordy if he could match RCA's offer. Gordy stated that doing so was "impossible". Ross then signed with RCA on May 20, 1981. At the time, Ross's was music history's most expensive recording deal.

In October 1981, Ross released her first RCA album, Why Do Fools Fall in Love. The album sold over a million copies and featured hit singles such as her remake of the classic hit of the same name and "Mirror Mirror". Shortly thereafter, Ross established her production company, named Anaid Productions ("Diana" spelled backwards), and also began investing in real estate and touring extensively in the United States and abroad.

Before the release of Why Do Fools Fall in Love, Ross hosted her first TV special in four years, Diana. Directed by Steve Binder, the concert portions of the special were filmed at Inglewood, California's 17,500-seat The Forum indoor stadium and featured performances by Michael Jackson, Muhammad Ali, Dallas actor Larry Hagman, music impresario Quincy Jones and members of the Joffrey Ballet.

In early 1982, Ross sang "The Star-Spangled Banner" at Super Bowl XVI and appeared on the musical variety show Soul Train. The episode, devoted completely to her, featured Ross performing several songs from Why Do Fools Fall in Love.

On May 6, 1982, Ross was honored with a star on the Hollywood Walk of Fame. She followed up the success of Why Do Fools Fall in Love with Silk Electric, which featured the Michael Jackson-written and -produced "Muscles", resulting in another Top 10 Grammy nominated success for Ross. The album eventually went gold on the strength of that song. In 1983, Ross ventured further out of her earlier soul-based sound for a more pop rock-oriented sound following the release of the Ross album. Though the album featured the Top 40 hit single, "Pieces of Ice", the Ross album did not generate any more hits or achieve gold status.

On July 21, 1983, Ross performed a free concert on Central Park's Great Lawn, aired live worldwide by Showtime. Proceeds of the concert would be donated to build a playground in the singer's name. Midway through the beginning of the show, a torrential downpour began. Ross tried to continue performing, but the severe weather forced the show to be stopped after 45 minutes. Ross urged the large crowd to exit the venue safely, promising to perform the next day.

The next day's concert suffered no rain, but the memorabilia that was supposed to be sold to raise money for the playground had already been destroyed by the storm. When journalists discovered the exorbitant costs of the two concerts, Ross faced criticism from Mayor Ed Koch and the Parks Department commissioner. During a subsequent mayoral press conference, Ross handed Koch a check for US$250,000 for the project. The Diana Ross Playground was built three years later.

In 1984, Ross released Swept Away. The album featured "All of You", a duet with friend Julio Iglesias. The single was featured on both Ross's album and Iglesias's 1100 Bel Air Place, his first English-language album. It became an international hit, as did the Lionel Richie-penned ballad "Missing You", composed as a tribute to Marvin Gaye, who had been killed earlier that year. Swept Away garnered gold record sales status.

Her 1985 album Eaten Alive, produced by Barry Gibb of the Bee Gees, garnered a number one single overseas and a Top 20 spot on the album charts. The song "Chain Reaction" reached number one in the U.K., Australia, South Africa, Israel and Ireland, and the title track, a collaboration with Michael Jackson and Gibb, also performed well. Both songs had strong music videos that propelled the tracks to success. The "Eaten Alive" video was patterned after the 1970s horror film The Island of Dr. Moreau, while the one for "Chain Reaction" saluted the 1960s American Bandstand-style TV shows. The video for "Experience", the third single from the album, reignited the "Eaten Alive" romantic storyline with Ross and actor Joseph Gian.

Earlier in 1985, Ross appeared as part of USA for Africa's "We Are the World" charity single, which sold over 20 million copies worldwide. Ross's 1987 follow-up to Eaten Alive, Red Hot Rhythm & Blues found less success; it reached No. 39 on the Billboard Top R&B Albums chart and No. 12 in Sweden. However, the album's accompanying television special was nominated for three Emmy Awards and won two: Outstanding Costume Design for a Variety or Music Program (Ray Aghayan and Ret Turner) and Outstanding Lighting Direction (Electronic) for a Miniseries or a Special (Greg Brunton).

On January 27, 1986, Ross hosted the 13th annual American Music Awards. Ross returned the next year to host the 14th annual telecast.

1988–1999: Return to Motown
In 1988, Ross chose to not renew her RCA contract and had been in talks with her former mentor Berry Gordy to return to Motown. When she learned of Gordy's plans to sell Motown, Ross tried advising him against the decision, though he ended up selling it to MCA Records in June of that year. Following the sale of the company, Ross was asked to return to the Motown label with the condition that she have shares in the company as a part-owner; Ross accepted the offer.

That same year, Ross was inducted into the Rock and Roll Hall of Fame as a member of the Supremes alongside her former singing partners Mary Wilson and Florence Ballard. She also recorded the theme song to animated adventure drama film The Land Before Time (1988). "If We Hold on Together" became an international hit, reaching number one in Japan.

Ross's next album, 1989's Workin' Overtime, was not a commercial success, despite the title track reaching the top three of the Billboards Hot R&B/Hip-Hop Songs chart. The album peaked at No. 34 on the Billboard Hot R&B Albums chart, and achieved top 25 placings in Japan and the UK, attaining a silver certification in the latter country. Subsequent releases, such as The Force Behind the Power (1991), Take Me Higher (1995), and Every Day Is a New Day (1999) produced similar results, achieving more international than domestic success.

In 1991, Ross became one of the few American artists to have headlined the annual Royal Variety Performance, performing a selection of her UK hits before Queen Elizabeth II and Prince Philip, Duke of Edinburgh at the Victoria Palace Theatre, London. This marked her second appearance at the Royal Variety Performance, the first being in 1968 with the Supremes.

The Force Behind the Power sparked an international comeback of sorts when the album went double platinum in the UK. led by the near chart-topping No. 2 UK hit single "When You Tell Me That You Love Me". The single's duet version with Irish boy band, Westlife, also hit No. 2 in the UK in 2005. The album performed well across Europe and into Japan as The Force Behind the Power achieved Gold record status in the nation. The album produced an astounding 9 singles across international territories, including another Top 10 hit, "One Shining Moment".

In 1993, Ross returned to acting with a dramatic role in the television film, Out of Darkness. Ross won acclaim for her role in the TV movie and earned her third Golden Globe nomination, although she did not win.

In 1994, One Woman: The Ultimate Collection, a career retrospective compilation, became a number one hit in the UK, selling quadruple platinum, and selling well across Europe and in the English-speaking world. The retrospective was EMI's alternative to Motown's box set Forever Diana: Musical Memoirs.

Ross performed during the opening ceremony of the 1994 FIFA World Cup held in Chicago, where she infamously missed a penalty kick that was part of her act, and during the pre-match entertainment of the 1995 Rugby League World Cup final at Wembley Stadium.

On January 28, 1996, Ross performed at the Super Bowl XXX halftime show, held at the Sun Devil Stadium in Tempe, Arizona. Earlier that month, Ross's Tokyo concert, Diana Ross: Live in Japan, filmed live at the city's Nippon Budokan Stadium, was released.

In May 1996, Ross received the World Music Awards' Lifelong Contribution to the Music Industry Award. On November 29, EMI released the compilation album, Voice of Love, featuring the singles "In the Ones You Love", "You Are Not Alone" and "I Hear (The Voice of Love)".

On February 8, 1997, EMI released the Japanese edition of Ross's album, A Gift of Love, featuring the single, "Promise Me You'll Try". In May, she performed with operatic tenors Plácido Domingo and José Carreras again at the Superconcert of the Century concert, held in Taipei, Taiwan. She later inducted the Jackson 5 into The Rock and Roll Hall of Fame on May 6.

On February 19, 1998, Ross hosted the Motown 40 telecast on ABC. In 1999, Ross was named the most successful female singer in the history of the United Kingdom charts, based upon a tally of her career hits. Madonna would soon succeed Ross as the most successful female artist in the UK. Later that year, Ross presented at the 1999 MTV Video Music Awards in September of the year and shocked the audience by touching rapper Lil' Kim's exposed breast and pasty-covered nipple, amazed at the young rapper's brashness.

In 1999, she and Brandy Norwood co-starred in the television movie, Double Platinum, which was aired prior to the release of Ross's album, Every Day Is a New Day.

2000–2003: Supremes reunion

Ross reunited with Mary Wilson first in 1976 to attend the funeral service of Florence Ballard, who had died in February of that year. In March 1983, Ross agreed to reunite with Wilson and Cindy Birdsong for the television special Motown 25: Yesterday, Today, Forever. The Supremes did not rehearse their performance for that evening, due to time constraints. A scheduled medley of hits was cancelled.

Instead of following producer Suzanne de Passe's instructions to recreate their choreography from their final Ed Sullivan Show appearance, Wilson (according to her autobiography) planned with Birdsong to take a step forward every time Ross did the same, then began to sing lead on the group's final number-one hit song, "Someday We'll Be Together", on which Wilson did not perform.

Later, Wilson introduced Berry Gordy from the stage (unaware that the program's script called for Ross to introduce Gordy), at which point Ross subtly pushed down Wilson's hand-held microphone, stating, "It's been taken care of." Ross then re-introduced Gordy. These moments were excised from the final edit of the taped special, but still made their way into the news media; People magazine reported that "Ross [did] some elbowing to get Wilson out of the spotlight."

In 1999, Ross and mega-tour promoter SFX Entertainment (which later became Live Nation) began negotiations regarding a Diana Ross tour which would include a Supremes segment. During negotiations with Ross, the promoters considered the creation of a Supremes tour, instead. Ross agreed. As the tour's co-producer, Ross invited all living former Supremes to participate. Neither Jean Terrell nor late 1970s member Susaye Greene chose to participate. 70s Supremes Lynda Laurence and Scherrie Payne were then touring as Former Ladies of the Supremes.

Ross contacted Mary Wilson and Cindy Birdsong, who then began negotiations with SFX. Negotiations with Wilson and Birdsong (who allowed Wilson to negotiate on her behalf) failed when Wilson refused SFX's and Ross's offer of $4 million for 30 performances. Following the passage of SFX's final deadline for Wilson to accept their offer, Payne and Laurence, already negotiating with SFX, signed on to perform with Ross on the tour.

Laurence and Payne would later say that they got along well with Ross. The newly formed group performed together on Today and The Oprah Winfrey Show, as well as VH1's VH1 Divas 2000: A Tribute to Diana Ross. The Return to Love Tour launched in June 2000, to a capacity audience in Philadelphia. The tour's final performance was at New York City's Madison Square Garden. The tour was cancelled by SFX shortly thereafter, due to mediocre ticket sales, despite glowing reviews from media as varied as Billboard magazine, the Detroit Free Press, the Los Angeles Times and The Village Voice newspapers.

On December 5, 2000, Ross received a Heroes Award from the National Academy of Recording Arts & Sciences (NARAS). The Heroes Award is the highest distinction bestowed by the New York Chapter.

Diana Ross's first public post-RTL appearance was at a fundraiser for former president Bill Clinton. In January 2001, Love & Life: The Very Best of Diana Ross was released in the United Kingdom, becoming Ross's 17th gold album in that country. In June, Ross presented costume designer Bob Mackie with the Lifetime Achievement Award at the American Fashion Awards.

Two days before the September 11 attacks, Ross performed "God Bless America" at the US Open before the tournament's women's final, between Venus and Serena Williams. Immediately following the attacks, Ross performed the song again at Shea Stadium, before the New York Mets first game, after driving cross-country to be with her children (in the wake of the attacks, flying in the U.S. was temporarily restricted.). Ross teamed with legendary singers Patti LaBelle and Eartha Kitt, among others, for a Nile Rodgers-produced recording of Sister Sledge's classic disco hit, "We Are Family", recorded to benefit the families of 9/11 victims.

In May 2002, Ross and all five of her children appeared on Barbara Walters' Mother's Day television special. Shortly thereafter, Ross admitted herself into the 30-day substance abuse program at the Promises Institute in Malibu, California, after friends and family began to notice a burgeoning alcohol problem. Ross left the program three weeks later and began to fulfill previously scheduled concert dates, beginning with a performance before a 60,000-strong crowd at London's Hyde Park, for Prince Charles' Prince's Trust charity.

U.S. ticket sales for the new tour were brisk, from coast to coast. Venues, such as Long Island's Westbury Music Fair, California's Cerritos Center for the Performing Arts and Humphrey's Concerts by the Bay, attempted to add extra shows, due to public demand. Sold-out performances in Boston and Ontario, Canada, followed. In August, shortly after the tour began, however, Ross re-entered the Promises Institute's substance abuse rehabilitation program. That December, during her stay at Arizona's Canyon Ranch Health Resort, Ross was pulled over by Tucson police for driving the wrong way on a one-way street. She failed a breathalizer test and was arrested for a DUI. Ross was later sentenced to 48 hours in jail, which she served near her home in Greenwich, Connecticut.

In January 2003, Ross was honored as Humanitarian of the Year by Nile Rodgers' We Are Family Foundation. Shortly thereafter, Ross was feted as an honored guest at the National Association of Black-Owned Broadcasters Awards. Later that year, Ross was the guest performer at that year's Metropolitan Museum of Art's Costume Institute's annual gala, in an ensemble custom-designed by fashion designer Tom Ford, followed by an appearance as the surprise celebrity model for American couturier Dennis Basso's runway show.

In February 2003, the Supremes were honored by the Rhythm and Blues Foundation with its Pioneer Award.

2004–2019: Later career

In May 2004, Ross and daughter Tracee Ellis Ross appeared on the cover of Essence magazine, in celebration of its 50th anniversary. On December 8, 2004, Ross was the featured performer for Stevie Wonder's Billboard Music Awards' Century Award tribute.

On January 14, 2005, Ross performed at the Tsunami Aid: A Concert of Hope TV concert to help raise money for the tsunami victims of the 2004 Indian Ocean earthquake. On January 20, 2005, Ross launched her M.A.C. Icon makeup collection, as part of the beauty corporation's Icon Series. In 2005, Ross participated in Rod Stewart's Thanks for the Memory: The Great American Songbook, Volume IV recording a duet version of the Gershwin standard, "I've Got a Crush on You". The song was released as promotion for the album and later reached No. 19 on the Billboard Hot Adult Contemporary chart, marking her first Billboard chart entry since 2000. Ross was featured in another hit duet, this time with Westlife, on a cover of Ross's 1991 hit "When You Tell Me That You Love Me", repeating the original recording's chart success, garnering a No. 2 UK Singles Chart hit (No. 1 in Ireland).

Also in 2005, Ross was featured as an honored guest at Oprah Winfrey's Legends Ball Weekend, a three-day celebration honoring 25 African-American women in art, entertainment and civil rights. On May 22, 2006, a year after the celebration, a one-hour program about the weekend aired on ABC, including celebrity interviews and behind-the-scenes moments. On March 22, 2006, Ross's televised Central Park concerts, entitled "For One & for All", were named TV Land Awards' Viewer's Choice for Television's Greatest Music Moment.

In June 2006, Universal released Ross's shelved 1972 Blue album. It peaked at No. 2 on Billboards Top Jazz Albums chart. Later in 2006, Ross released her first studio album in seven years with I Love You. It would be released on EMI/Manhattan Records in the United States in January 2007. EMI Inside later reported the album had sold more than 622,000 copies worldwide. "I Love You" peaked at No. 32 on Billboards Hot 200 albums chart and No. 16 on Billboards Top R&B Albums chart. Ross later ventured on a world tour to promote I Love You. In 2007, Ross was honored with the BET Awards' Lifetime Achievement Award and, later, as one of the honorees at the Kennedy Center Honors.

On August 28, 2008, Ross performed at the opening of the US Open tennis tournament, as part of a tribute to Billie Jean King. Ross headlined the 2008 Nobel Peace Prize Concert in Oslo, Norway.

In October 2009, Ross was the featured performer at the annual Symphonica in Rosso concert series, held at the GelreDome Stadium in Arnhem, Netherlands.

In 2010, Ross embarked on her first headlining tour in three years titled the More Today Than Yesterday: The Greatest Hits Tour. Dedicated to the memory of her late friend Michael Jackson, the concert tour garnered positive reviews, nationwide.

In 2011, Ross was inducted into the Michigan Rock and Roll Legends Hall of Fame.

In February 2012, Ross received her first Grammy Award, for Lifetime Achievement, and announced the nominees for the Album of the Year. In May, a DVD of her Central Park concert performances, For One & For All, was released and featured commentary from Steve Binder, who directed the special. A month later, on December 9, she performed as the marquee and headlining performer at the White House-hosted Christmas in Washington concert, where she performed before former President Barack Obama. The event was later broadcast as an annual special on TNT.

In 2013, Ross completed a tour in South America and a tour in the United States. On July 3, 2014, Ross was awarded the Ella Fitzgerald Award for "her extraordinary contribution to contemporary jazz vocals", at the Montreal International Jazz Festival. On November 20, 2014, Ross presented the Dick Clark Award for Excellence to Taylor Swift at the American Music Awards.

In 2015, Ross appeared in the video for the song "How to Live Alone" performed by her son Evan Ross. On April 1, 2015, Ross began the first of nine performances as a part of her mini-residency, The Essential Diana Ross: Some Memories Never Fade at The Venetian in Las Vegas, Nevada. On November 27, 2015, Motown/Universal released the album Diana Ross Sings Songs from The Wiz, recorded in 1978. The album features Ross's versions of songs from the film version of the musical The Wiz, in which she starred along with Michael Jackson, Nipsey Russell, Ted Ross, Richard Pryor and Lena Horne.

In February 2016, Ross resumed her In the Name of Love Tour, which began in 2013. On November 22, 2016, Ross was awarded the Presidential Medal of Freedom by President Obama.

In December 2016, Billboard magazine named her the 50th most successful dance club artist of all time.

On June 30, 2017, Ross headlined the Essence Festival in New Orleans, Louisiana, with her daughter Rhonda Ross-Kendrick performing as the opening act. On November 19, 2017, Ross received the American Music Awards Lifetime Achievement Award. Ross performed several of her hits, ending with "Ain't No Mountain High Enough", during which she brought all of her grandchildren onstage. Her eldest grandson, eight-year-old Raif-Henok Emmanuel Kendrick, son of Rhonda Ross-Kendrick and husband, Rodney, performed an impromptu dance behind Ross, which gained attention. Ross was then joined onstage by all of her children, their spouses, first ex-husband Robert Ellis, Smokey Robinson (who brought Ross to Motown) and Motown founder, Berry Gordy.

In December 2017, Ross appeared on the Home Shopping Network to promote her first fragrance, Diamond Diana. The fragrance sold out within hours. Ross made several hour-long appearances on the network, and also released a tie-in CD retrospective collection of her music titled Diamond Diana. Diamond Diana peaked at No. 6 on the Billboard R&B Albums chart and No. 5 on its Top Album Sales chart. The CD's first single release, "Ain't No Mountain High Enough 2017", remixed by Eric Kupper, reached No. 1 on the Billboard Dance Club Songs chart.

On February 8, 2018, Ross began a new mini-residency at Wynn Las Vegas. On August 4, 2018, Ross scored another No. 1 hit on Billboard's Top Dance Chart with "I'm Coming Out/Upside Down 2018". She performed a song from a to-be-released compilation Christmas album at the Macy's Thanksgiving Day Parade on November 22, 2018.

In December 2018, Ross consolidated her status as a dance diva by ranking No. 3 in the Billboard Dance Club Songs Artists year-end chart.

On February 10, 2019, The Recording Academy honored Ross at the 61st Annual Grammy Awards. Ross performed "The Best Years of My Life" and "Reach Out and Touch (Somebody's Hand)". In 2019, her song "The Boss" was remixed by Eric Kupper as "The Boss 2019", and reached No. 1 on Billboards Top Dance Chart on April 13.

On October 10, 2019, it was announced that Ross would play the Sunday legends slot on the Pyramid Stage at the Glastonbury Festival for the festival's 50th anniversary; however, the festival was postponed due to the COVID-19 pandemic. Then on November 10, 2021, Ross confirmed that she would play the legends slot at the 2022 festival.

2020–present: Thank You and Glastonbury
In May 2020, Ross released Supertonic: Mixes, a collection of nine of her greatest hits remixed by Eric Kupper and featuring her four back-to-back No.1 hits on Billboard Dance Club Songs chart: "Ain't No Mountain High Enough 2017", "I'm Coming Out/Upside Down 2018", "The Boss 2019", and "Love Hangover 2020". In July 2020, "Supertonic: Mixes" was also released on CD and crystal-clear vinyl LP.

Ross released her twenty-fifth studio album Thank You in November 2021. It was written and recorded during the COVID-19 pandemic lockdown and contains her first original material since 1999's Every Day Is a New Day.

In May 2022, she released the single "Turn Up the Sunshine", a collaboration with psychedelic pop band Tame Impala. The track is the lead single from the Jack Antonoff-produced original soundtrack album of the film Minions: The Rise of Gru. With the exception of this track, the album primarily features new spins on classic 1970s hits by artists such as Brittany Howard, St. Vincent, H.E.R., and many others. 

On June 4, 2022, Ross appeared as the finale act at the Platinum Party at the Palace in celebration of the Platinum Jubilee of Elizabeth II. On June 10, Ross kicked off the UK leg of her Thank You Tour at Cardiff Castle. On June 26, Ross appeared live on the Pyramid Stage at the Glastonbury Festival.

On November 15, 2022, Ross received a 2023 Grammy Award nomination in the Best Traditional Pop Vocal Album category for "Thank You".

Personal life
Relationships and family
Ross has been married twice and has five children.

Ross became romantically involved with Motown CEO Berry Gordy in 1965. The relationship lasted several years, resulting in the birth of Ross's eldest child, Rhonda Suzanne Silberstein, in August 1971. Two months into her pregnancy with Rhonda, in January 1971, Ross married music executive Robert Ellis Silberstein, who raised Rhonda as his own daughter, despite knowing her true paternity. Ross told Rhonda that Gordy was her biological father when Rhonda was 13 years old. Beforehand, Rhonda referred to Gordy as "Uncle B.B."

Ross has two daughters with Silberstein, Tracee Joy Silberstein (Tracee Ellis Ross) and Chudney Lane Silberstein, born in 1972 and 1975, respectively. Ross and Silberstein divorced in 1977.

Ross dated Gene Simmons, bassist and co-lead singer for the band Kiss, from 1980 to 1983. They began dating after Cher, who had remained friends with Simmons following their break-up, suggested he ask Ross to help him choose her Christmas present. Simmons, in his autobiography, contends that he was not dating Cher when he met Ross. Ross ended her relationship with Simmons when he gave Ross the erroneous impression that he had resumed his relationship with Cher. Simmons' story differed in 2015 when he revealed that he fell in love with Ross while dating Cher, which ended Ross and Cher's friendship.

Ross met her second husband, Norwegian shipping magnate Arne Næss Jr., in 1985, and married him the following year. She became stepmother to his three elder children; Katinka, Christoffer, and folk singer Leona Naess. They have two sons together: Ross Arne (born in 1987) and Evan Olav (born in 1988). Ross and Næss divorced in 2000, after press reports revealed that Næss had fathered a child with another woman in Norway. Ross considers Næss the love of her life. Næss fell to his death in a South African mountain climbing accident in 2004. Ross remains close with her three ex-stepchildren.

Ross has seven grandchildren: grandson Raif-Henok (born in 2009 to her daughter Rhonda); grandsons Leif  (born on June 5, 2016) and Indigo (born 2017), born to her son Ross Næss; granddaughters Callaway Lane (born in 2012) and Everlee (born October 2019) born to Ross's daughter Chudney; granddaughter Jagger Snow (born in 2015), and grandson Ziggy (born in 2020) to her son Evan.

Religious views
Diana Ross was raised in the Baptist church. According to her 1993 autobiography, Secrets of a Sparrow, her initial performances were in the Bessemer Baptist Church of Bessemer, Alabama, led by her maternal grandfather, Pastor William Moten, who (with his wife) raised her and her siblings there during their mother's bouts with tuberculosis.

2002 arrest
Diana Ross was arrested for DUI on December 30, 2002, in Tucson, Arizona, while undergoing substance abuse treatment at a local rehabilitation facility. She later served a two-day sentence near her Connecticut estate.

Legacy

Ross has influenced many artists including Michael Jackson, Beyoncé, Madonna,  Jade Thirlwall,  Questlove, Ledisi and the Ting Tings.

Several of Ross's songs have been covered and sampled. "Ain't No Mountain High Enough" has been featured in the film Chicken Little. The song has also been covered live and on albums by Jennifer Lopez and Amy Winehouse. Janet Jackson sampled "Love Hangover" on her 1997 song "My Need" (featured on the album The Velvet Rope), having already sampled "Love Child" and "Someday We'll Be Together" by Ross & the Supremes on her 1993 tracks "You Want This" and "If" (both released as singles from the Janet album). "Love Hangover" was also sampled in Monica's 1998 number 1 "The First Night" as well as being sampled by Will Smith, Master P (who also sampled "Missing You"), Heavy D and Bone Thugs-n-Harmony, "It's Your Move" was sampled in 2011 by Vektroid for her song "Lisa Frank 420 / Modern Computing", which appeared in her ninth album Floral Shoppe under her one-time alias Macintosh Plus. "It's My House" was sampled by Lady Gaga for her song "Replay" which appeared on the 2020 album Chromatica.

Various works have been inspired by Ross's career and life. The character of Deena Jones in both the play and film versions of Dreamgirls was inspired by Ross.

Motown: The Musical is a Broadway musical that launched on April 14, 2013. It is the story of Berry Gordy's creation of Motown Records and his romance with Diana Ross. She was portrayed by Valisia LeKae in 2013 and Lucy St. Louis in 2016. Ross was also portrayed by Candice Marie Woods (from 2017 to 2019) and Deri'Andra Tucker (2021) in the stage play Ain't Too Proud. There have been many other petryals of Ross in films, television and other media including Holly Robinson Peete in The Jacksons: An American Dream (1992) and Michelle  Williams of Destiny's Child on American Soul (2019).

As a member of the Supremes, her songs "Stop! In the Name of Love" and "You Can't Hurry Love" are among the Rock and Roll Hall of Fame's 500 Songs that Shaped Rock and Roll. They were inducted into the Rock and Roll Hall of Fame in 1988, received a star on the Hollywood Walk of Fame in 1994, and entered into the Vocal Group Hall of Fame in 1998. In 2004, Rolling Stone placed the group at number 96 on their list of the "100 Greatest Artists of All Time".

As lead singer of the Supremes and as a solo artist, Ross has earned 18 number-one singles (12 as lead singer of the Supremes and 6 as a solo artist). Ross is the only female artist to have number one singles as a solo artist; as the other half of a duet (Lionel Richie); as a member of a trio (the Supremes); and, as an ensemble member ("We Are the World" by USA for Africa). Ross was featured on the Notorious B.I.G.'s 1997 number-one hit "Mo Money Mo Problems" since her voice from her 1980 hit "I'm Coming Out" was sampled for the song.

Billboard magazine named Ross the "female entertainer of the century" in 1976. Ross is also one of the few recording artists to have two stars on the Hollywood Walk of Fame—one as a solo artist and the other as a member of the Supremes. After her 1983 concert in Central Park, Diana Ross Playground was named in her honor with a groundbreaking opening ceremony in 1986.

Berry Gordy asked Ross to introduce The Jackson Five to the public. Eventually, public misunderstandings resulted in Ross erroneously being given credit for the discovery of the Jackson 5. Gordy decided that the misunderstanding was "good for business", so her "discovery" became a part of Motown's marketing and promotions plan for the Jackson 5. Consequently, their debut album was titled Diana Ross Presents The Jackson 5. Motown producer Bobby Taylor claims to have discovered the Jacksons, though, singer Gladys Knight also makes the claim. Even so, Ross embraced the role and became a good friend of Michael Jackson, serving as a mother figure to him.

On January 24, 1985, Kaufman Astoria Studios held a dedication ceremony in Astoria, Queens to honor Ross by naming Studio 4 at the studios after her. The Diana Ross Building served as an acknowledgement of Ross' contribution in bringing the studio back to the forefront after being faced with possible demolition, through her involvement in The Wiz.

In 2006, Ross was one of 25 African-American women saluted at Oprah Winfrey's Legends Ball, a three-day celebration, honoring their contributions to art, entertainment, and civil rights.

Diana Ross was named one of the Five Mighty Pop Divas of the Sixties along with Dusty Springfield, Aretha Franklin, Martha Reeves, and Dionne Warwick.

Awards and nominations

On November 16, 2016, Ross was announced as one of the 21 recipients of the Presidential Medal of Freedom, the nation's highest civilian honor.

In 2023, Supremes co-founders Ross and the late Mary Wilson and Florence Ballard received the Grammys’ Lifetime Achievement Award, with Ross becoming the first woman to win the award twice (she earned a solo honor in 2012).

DiscographyStudio albums Diana Ross (1970)
 Everything Is Everything (1970)
 Surrender (1971)
 Touch Me in the Morning (1973)
 Diana & Marvin (with Marvin Gaye) (1973)
 Last Time I Saw Him (1973)
 Diana Ross (1976)
 Baby It's Me (1977)
 Ross (1978)
 The Boss (1979)
 Diana (1980)
 Why Do Fools Fall in Love (1981)
 Silk Electric (1982)
 Ross (1983)
 Swept Away (1984)
 Eaten Alive (1985)
 Red Hot Rhythm & Blues (1987)
 Workin' Overtime (1989)
 The Force Behind the Power (1991)
 A Very Special Season (1994)
 Take Me Higher (1995)
 Every Day Is a New Day (1999)
 Blue (2006)
 I Love You (2006)
 Diana Ross Sings Songs from The Wiz (2015)
 Thank You (2021)

Filmography

 Lady Sings the Blues (1972)
 Mahogany (1975)
 The Wiz (1978)
 Out of Darkness * (1994)
 Double Platinum * (1999)
(* = made directly for television)

Television
 T.A.M.I. Show (with the Supremes) (1964)
 Tarzan (with the Supremes) (1968)
 TCB (with the Supremes) (1968)
 The Dinah Shore Special: Like Hep (with Dinah Shore and Lucille Ball) (1969)
 G.I.T. on Broadway (with the Supremes and the Temptations) (1969)
 Diana! (1971)
 The Jackson 5ive (1971)
 Make Room for Granddaddy (1971)
 Here I Am: An Evening with Diana Ross (1977)
 The Muppet Show (1977)
 Standing Room Only (HBO) (1980)
 Diana! (CBS TV Special) (1981)
 Motown 25: Yesterday, Today, Forever (1983)
 Diana Ross: Live in Central Park/For One and For All (Showtime) (1983)
 Diana Ross: Red Hot Rhythm and Blues (1987)
 Diana Ross: Workin' Overtime HBO: World Stage (1989)
 Diana Ross Live! The Lady Sings... Jazz & Blues: Stolen Moments (1992)
 Christmas in Vienna (1992)
 BET Walk of Fame (1993)
 Always is Forever: 30th Anniversary (1993)
 1994 FIFA World Cup (1994)
 Super Bowl XXX halftime show (NBC) (1996)
 Super Concert of the Century (1997)
 An Audience with Diana Ross (1999)
 VH1 Divas 2000: A Tribute to Diana Ross (2000)
 The Making and Meaning of We Are Family (documentary) (2002)
 Tsunami Aid (2005)
 BET Awards 2007 (2007)
 Kennedy Center Honors (2007)
 Nobel Peace Prize Concert (2008)
 The Oprah Winfrey Show: Farewell and Salute (2011)
 Christmas in Washington (2012)
 The Voice (2014)
 HSN (2017)
 Ashlee + Evan (2018)

Stage
 An Evening with Diana Ross (1976)

ToursHeadliningThe Diana Ross Show 
An Evening with Diana Ross 
Diana Ross Tour 
Diana Ross on Tour 
Up Front Tour 
Missing You Tour 
Eaten Alive Tour 
Workin' Overtime World Tour 
Here & Now Tour 
Forever Diana! World Tour 
Take Me Higher Tour 
Voice of Love Tour 
Always is Forever Tour 
Live Love Tour 
This is It 
I Love You Tour 
More Today Than Yesterday: The Greatest Hits Tour 
In the Name of Love Tour 
Brand New Day Tour 
Music Box Tour 
Thank You Tour  Co-headlining toursSuperconcert of the Century 
Return to Love Tour Residency shows'

Some Memories Never Fade 
All the Best 
Endless Memories 
Music and Love 
Diamond Diana 
An Extraordinary Evening

Bibliography
 
 
  (A scrapbook-style collection of photographs)

See also

 List of artists who reached number one in the United States
 List of artists who reached number one on the U.S. Dance Club Songs chart
 List of Billboard number-one singles
 List of Billboard number-one dance club songs

References

External links

 
 
 
 
 
 

 
1944 births
20th-century American actresses
20th-century American singers
20th-century American women singers
20th-century Baptists
21st-century American actresses
21st-century American singers
21st-century American women singers
21st-century Baptists
Actresses from Detroit
African-American actresses
African-American Christians
African-American record producers
African-American women singers
American disco singers
American film actresses
American freestyle musicians
American sopranos
American soul singers
American stage actresses
American television actresses
American women pop singers
American women record producers
Ballad musicians
Baptists from Michigan
Baptists from New York (state)
Cass Technical High School alumni
César Honorary Award recipients
Grammy Lifetime Achievement Award winners
Kennedy Center honorees
Living people
Motown artists
New Star of the Year (Actress) Golden Globe winners
Presidential Medal of Freedom recipients
RCA Records artists
Record producers from Michigan
Record producers from New York (state)
Silberstein family
Singers from Detroit
Special Tony Award recipients
The Supremes members
Universal Motown Records artists